Tears of the Dragon is a South Korean historical television series. It aired on KBS1 from November 24, 1996 to May 31, 1998 for 159 episodes. The series spans from the foundation of Joseon to the reign of King Sejong. It's considered one of the best historical dramas in South Korea, reaching a viewership rating of 49%. It is also the first series based on historical researches on Prime Minister Jeong Do-jeon.

Plot
The series portrays the life of Yi Bang-won (posthumously known as "Taejong"), the third king of Joseon and fifth son of its founder. It depicts him as being committed to the stability of the kingdom, a commitment that translates into affection and devotion towards his father and his heir (originally Taejong's first-born son, Yi Je), although these feelings are not reciprocated due to anger about the various assassinations and executions carried out by Taejong. The anger culminates in the retired Taejo's efforts to remove his son by backing the Jo Sa-wi rebellion and personally shooting an arrow at him during a reconciliation meeting. Taejong grows to become perpetually suspicious of those around him (especially his in-laws), resulting in purges, a typical example being his execution of his wife's influence-peddling-but-loyal oldest brothers and naively-innocent youngest brothers. In disgusted response, his crown prince rejects the throne to become a playboy and his second-born son, Yi Bo, joins the Buddhist priesthood, deferring the position to the third-born son, Yi Do.

Cast
Kim Mu-saeng as Yi Seong-gye/King Taejo, first ruler of Joseon
Han Young-sook as Queen Sinui, Taejo's first wife
Kim Young-ran as Queen Sindeok, Taejo's second wife
Tae Min-young as Yi Bang-gwa/King Jeongjong, second ruler of Joseon
Yoo Dong-geun as Yi Bang-won/King Taejong, third ruler of Joseon
Choi Myung-gil as Queen Wongyeong, Taejong's wife
Kim Hye-ri as Royal Noble Consort Hyo, Taejong's concubine
Lee Min-woo as Grand Prince Yangnyeong, Taejong's first son
Ahn Jae-mo as Grand Prince Chungnyeong/King Sejong, fourth ruler of Joseon
Im Seo-yeon as Queen Soheon, Sejong's wife
Kim Heung-gi as Jeong Do-jeon

Awards and nominations

References

External links
  
 

1996 South Korean television series debuts
1998 South Korean television series endings
1990s South Korean television series
Korean Broadcasting System television dramas
Korean-language television shows
Television series set in the Joseon dynasty
Television series set in Goryeo
South Korean historical television series
Television series set in the 14th century